The Bank of Bombay was the second oldest bank in India after the The Madras Bank (1683). It was started in 1720, and lasted until 1770.

The Bank is one of the three oldest Banks in India, along with the The Madras Bank (1683) and the Bank of Hindostan.

History

Founding 

The Bank was founded in the year of 1720. The initial capital of the bank was Rupees 100,000 and the  amount was financed by the East India Company.

The Bank was founded by the British employees of the East India Company in Bombay, Bombay Presidency. The Bank's initial headquarters were in the Bombay Castle.

Management 

The bank was staffed by mostly British nationals who were drawn mainly from the East India Company.

The bank was managed by the government of the Bombay Presidency.

Final Years 

In the 1760s, the bank owned a sum of Rupees 28,00,000 to its creditors. Moreover the assets mortgaged to the Bank had fallen into disrepair. The bank found itself in a precarious financial situation. The then government of the Bombay Presidency decided to write off the dues of the bank and establish a new bank with the same name to take its place.

The Bank wound up its operations in the year 1770.

Legacy 

The bank is chiefly notable for being only the second bank founded in India, making it older than all other Indian banks except The Madras Bank (1683).

In 1840, another bank of the same name was founded to take its place. However this 1840 bank has survived to the present day in the form of the State Bank of India, through its predecessor the Imperial Bank of India.

See also

Indian banking
List of oldest banks in India
List of banks in India

References

External links
 History of the Bank of Bombay
 History of the Bank
 History of the Bank

Defunct banks of India
Companies based in Mumbai
Banks established in 1720